John F. Flanagan (also cited John Flannigan in early records; April 4, 1865–March 28, 1952) was a sculptor who was widely known for his statuary and plaquettes but recognized foremost for his designs of coinage and commemorative medals. Among his best known designs are the obverse (front) and reverse of the United States quarter dollar featuring the profile of George Washington, a coin that has been in continuous circulation with some modifications since 1932.

Washington quarter
Flanagan designed the Washington U.S. quarter dollar coin, which was issued in 1932. Flanagan's initials can be found at the base of Washington's neck. He designed both sides of the quarter, adapting the obverse profile of the United States's first president from a bust of Washington initially produced by French neoclassical sculptor Jean-Antoine Houdon in 1786.  His original design for the quarter continued through 1998, after which the new "State Quarter" series resulted in the modification of Flanagan's portrait of Washington and the removal altogether of the reverse design. In 2021, after the "America the Beautiful" coin series ended, Flanagan's design for the obverse of the quarter returned for one year, with the reverse changed to Benjamin Sowards' engraving of Washington crossing the Delaware.

Medallic work
Flanagan was a prolific medallic artist. Among his more important works, he designed the official medal of the Panama-Pacific International Exposition of 1915. He later sculpted the Verdun Medal, a gift of the United States to France commemorating the World War I Battle of Verdun. The inscription on it reads, 'They Shall Not Pass', and the medal is found in the Lafayette Database of American Art in French National collections. Flanagan also created the first issue of the influential Circle of Friends of the Medallion series, 1909's Hudson-Fulton Celebration, and contributed to the successor Society of Medalists series with his Aphrodite-Swift Runners medal of 1932.

Other work
From 1885 to 1890, Flanagan was a studio assistant to Augustus St. Gaudens and worked on several large projects. A bronze portrait bust of St. Gaudens by Flanagan of 1924 exists in several copies, in the Metropolitan Museum of Art, National Gallery of Art, New York University and elsewhere.

In 1911, he was elected into the National Academy of Design as an Associate member, and became a full Academician in 1928.

Gallery

See also
List of Saltus Award winners

References

1865 births
1952 deaths
American currency designers
Artists from Newark, New Jersey
20th-century American sculptors
20th-century American male artists
19th-century American sculptors
19th-century American male artists
American male sculptors
National Sculpture Society members
Sculptors from New Jersey
Coin designers
Members of the American Academy of Arts and Letters